Pseudotoites is an extinct genus from a well-known class of fossil cephalopods, the ammonites. It lived during the Middle Jurassic.

Distribution
Argentina

References

Jurassic ammonites
Fossils of Argentina
Bajocian life